Navarangpura, also spelled Navrangpura, is an area in the city of Ahmedabad in Gujarat, India.

Educational and research institutions 
The following well known educational and research institutions are located in Navarangpura:

 Ahmedabad Textile Industry's Research Association
 Center for Environmental Planning and Technology
 Gujarat University
 L.D. College of Engineering
 Mount Carmel High School, Ahmedabad
 Physical Research Laboratory
 Vikram Sarabhai Community Science Centre

Sports 
Sardar Vallabhbhai Patel Stadium, Ahmedabad is located in Navarangpura.

Neighbourhoods in Ahmedabad